Godfrey Bernard "Goofy" Lawrence (born 31 March 1932) is a former Rhodesian cricketer who played in five Test matches for South Africa in the 1961–62 season.

A tall right-arm fast-medium bowler from Rhodesia, Lawrence was part of a new-look South African team for the series against New Zealand in 1961–62. Despite his success in the series and continued good form in the Currie Cup until the end of the 1965–66 season, he played no further Tests.

He took 8 for 53 in the Second Test in 1961–62. His best first-class bowling figures were 8 for 42 (after taking 3 for 56 and making 32 not out at number 10 in the first innings) for Rhodesia against Western Province in 1965–66. He played for Rhodesia from 1952–53 to 1965–66, then two matches for Natal B in 1966–67.

Lawrence's son Stephen was a leading Australian rules footballer in the 1990s.

References

External links
 

1932 births
Living people
Cricketers from Harare
South Africa Test cricketers
South African cricketers
Rhodesia cricketers